The 2015 Asia Rugby women's qualification series for rugby sevens at the 2016 Summer Olympics was held over two rounds in Hong Kong and Tokyo from 7–29 November, following a preliminary qualifying round held in Chennai on 7–8 March. Japan won both rounds to gain direct qualification to the 2016 Olympic Sevens women's tournament.

Preliminary qualifying round

Pool stage

Playoffs
Fifth place match

Third place match

Final

Pre-qualifier placings

Asia Olympic qualifying rounds 
Eight women's teams were originally scheduled for the Asia Olympic qualifying rounds, but Thailand, Singapore and Uzbekistan withdrew and Guam was invited to make it six teams in the competition.

Hong Kong

Pool stage

Playoffs
Fifth place match

Third place match

Final

Japan

Pool stage

Playoffs
Fifth place match

Third place match

Final

Placings

References

Rugby sevens at the 2016 Summer Olympics – Women's tournament
2015 in women's rugby union
2015 rugby sevens competitions
International rugby union competitions hosted by Hong Kong
2015 in Hong Kong sport